Her Other Self ("The other 'I'") is a 1941 German drama film directed by Wolfgang Liebeneiner and starring Hilde Krahl, Mathias Wieman, and Erich Ponto.

The film's sets were designed by the art director Otto Erdmann and Franz F. Fürst.

Cast

References

Bibliography

External links

1941 films
1941 drama films
German drama films
Films of Nazi Germany
1940s German-language films
Films directed by Wolfgang Liebeneiner
Tobis Film films
German black-and-white films
1940s German films